This is a partial list of victims of violence in Punjab (India) during the 1980s and 1990s.

During the Punjab insurgency

After end of Punjab insurgency 
On 31 August 1995, Chief minister Beant Singh was killed by a suicide bomber. The pro-Khalistan group Babbar Khalsa claimed responsibility for the assassination, but "security authorities" were reported to be doubtful of the truth of that claim. A 2006 press release by the Embassy of the United States in New Delhi indicated that the responsible organization was the Khalistan Commando Force.

The Indian Express reported in its online edition on 19 June 2006 that the Khalistan Zindabad Force was behind bomb blasts in Jalandhar, India, at the Inter-State Bus Terminus that left three people killed and injured 12.  A police spokesman said the attack was planned by a pair of KZF leaders, one based in Pakistan and one in Canada, and executed by a "local criminal".

On 22 May 2005, Consecutive bomb blasts took place in the Liberty cinema and Satyam cinema in New Delhi during the screeing of the movie Jo Jo Bole So Nihaal (film) in which 3 people died and dozens were injured. The movie was being opposed by a section of intellectual Sikhs.

On 14 October 2007, Six people were killed and 32 injured in a bomb blast at Shingaar cinema hall, Ludhiana.

On 24 September 2009, the Punjab Police arrested two Babbar Khalsa militants involved in the assassination of Rulda Singh, president of the Punjab Rashtriya Sikh Sangat who was shot at and seriously injured by two unidentified persons at his residence near New Grain market on 29 July.

2016–17 targeted killings in Punjab, India: 
multiple attacks on Hindu leaders of Shiv Sena, Rashtriya Swayam Sevak Sangh and BJP happened during the years 2016–17. Six leaders of these organisations were killed.

See also 
 Punjab insurgency
 Kharku
 Operation Blue Star
 Operation Woodrose
 Operation Black Thunder
 1991 Punjab killings
 1987 Punjab killings

References

Bibliography
 Knights of Falsehood, KPS Gill, 1997
 Global security watch, Satyapal Dang, 2008
 Sikhs Slay 13 Hindus In Punjab, United Press International, 29 March 1986
 Sikh Extremists Open Fire On Top Punjab Police Official, 4 October 1986 The New York Times

External links
 Bombs exploded today at a crowded vegetable wholesale market
 Bomb Blast Kills 24, Injures 45 in India; Sikh Militants Blamed
44 Slain in hindu sikh violence

Terrorism in Punjab, India
Terrorism
Punjab India
History of Punjab, India (1947–present)
Sikh terrorism
Lists of disasters in India
Terrorist incidents in Punjab